Boogerman: A Pick and Flick Adventure is a 2D platform video game created by Interplay Productions and released for the Sega Genesis in 1994 and later on the Super NES in 1995. The Genesis version was also released on the Wii Virtual Console in North America on November 24, 2008 and in Europe on December 12, 2008. The game's lead character also appears as a playable character and the rival of Earthworm Jim in Interplay's ClayFighter 63⅓.

Plot
One dark and stormy evening, the civic-minded Professor Stinkbaum was working in his lab above Takey Dump where he was secretly building a machine called Zap-o-Matic that would save the world from pollution by transporting it to a place he called Dimension X-Crement. That same evening, eccentric millionaire Snotty Ragsdale paid a visit to the lab to investigate this project and find out how such a thing was possible. He was not too sure about the machine's purpose. After activating the machine, Ragsdale inhaled a cloud of pepper through his nose, causing him to let out a mighty sneeze. The power of the sneeze broke the machine, opening a portal. Just then, a mysterious giant arm popped out of the portal and stole the machine's main power source – Snotrium 357. In response to this danger, Snotty rushed into the men's room to change into his alter ego, the mighty Boogerman, and jumped into the portal to pursue the arm to learn the reason for the theft it had committed.

Gameplay
The gameplay of Boogerman operates as a simple side-scroller, with burp/fart ammunition, as well as booger ammunition. There are 20+ different levels, as well as a final boss level. Each level consists of a slight puzzle to finish to the end, and to accomplish this it is necessary to defeat foes, unique to each level. Following this boss battle is a "sandbox" playable credit scrolling, as the player is able to "fly-fart" with unlimited fuel (something the player is not able to do during normal gameplay).

Throughout the game, Boogerman's health is represented by his cape which will change from red to yellow whenever he takes damage from enemy attacks, and if he is hit while his cape is yellow, he loses a life. The player can gather capes to restore Boogerman's health. Also scattered through the levels are huts that will activate checkpoints if touched.

Reception

GamePros Manny LaMancha gave the Genesis version a positive review, summarizing that "As disgusting as Boogerman can be, as a video game it's fun to play. It almost comes off as a parody of last year's Disney's Aladdin, with extensive, challenging levels that take you up and down, left and right, and in and out of distant areas."

Videohead of GamePro said that while the game's gross-out premise is juvenile, the gameplay is high-quality and fun. He added that while the Super NES version is a simple port of the Genesis version, it features more colors, better voice clips, stronger bass sound, and improved controls.

The protagonist of Boogerman: A Pick and Flick Adventure was awarded Grossest Character of 1994 by Electronic Gaming Monthly. The website IGN nominated Boogerman the third worst character name in a 2007 list.

Game Informer gave the game an overall score of 7.5 out of 10 saying that kids will love this game because of the game's simple humor concluding "If you're looking for an action/platform game with a touch of the crass, look no further than Boogerman."

Legacy
On October 16, 2013, Mike Stragey and Chris Tremmel announced that an HD sequel to the game was in the works under their company name Toy Ghost by starting a Kickstarter campaign in which they have set a $375,000 goal by November 20 to finish the game for a potential November 2014 release.

On October 24, 2013, Toy Ghost announced that for the backers who pledged $40 or more will be rewarded with an exclusive co-op mode featuring Earthworm Jim, which would have been the first time since 1997's ClayFighter 63⅓ that they had appeared in a game together.

It only reached a total of $40,252 when it reached its goal date; however, Stragey and Tremmel later sent it to the Steam Greenlight website, and announced on Boogermans official Facebook page "[They were] waiting to see how things go on Greenlight and hope to try another Kickstarter". However, nothing has been heard from them since, and the project has been assumed to be quietly cancelled.

References

External links
 

1994 video games
Interplay Entertainment games
Parody superheroes
Parody video games
Platform games
Sega Genesis games
Side-scrolling video games
Single-player video games
Superhero video games
Super Nintendo Entertainment System games
Virtual Console games
Video games developed in the United States
Video games scored by Matt Furniss